The Osteoarthritis Research Society International (OARSI) is a non-profit scientific organization.
The mission of OARSI is to promote and advance research for the prevention and treatment of osteoarthritis.

OARSI publishes an international fully peer-reviewed multidisciplinary journal, Osteoarthritis and Cartilage. Many specialists, practitioners and researchers use this journal as a forum for idea dissemination related to diseases of cartilage and joints.

World Congress on Osteoarthritis

Each year OARSI hosts a world congress on osteoarthritis.

References

External links
 Osteoarthritis Research Society International

Arthritis organizations
International medical and health organizations
International organizations based in the United States